is a passenger railway station located in the town of Itano, Itano District, Tokushima Prefecture, Japan. It is operated by JR Shikoku and has the station number "T08".

Lines
Awa-Ōmiya Station is served by the JR Shikoku Kōtoku Line and is located 53.2 km from the beginning of the line at Takamatsu. Only local services stop at the station.

Layout
The station consists of an island platform serving two tracks. The station building beside the tracks is unstaffed and serves only as a waiting room. Access to the island platform is by means of a footbridge.

Platforms

History
At that time the station was operated by Japanese Government Railways, later becoming Japanese National Railways (JNR). With the privatization of JNR on 1 April 1987, control of the station passed to JR Shikoku.

Surrounding area
The station located in the mountainous area on the way from central Itano to the crossing of Osaka Pass.
Takamatsu Expressway
Itano Municipal Itano Higashi Elementary School Osaka Branch School

See also
List of railway stations in Japan

References

External links

 JR Shikoku timetable

Railway stations in Tokushima Prefecture
Railway stations in Japan opened in 1935
Itano, Tokushima